Chaim Brovender (born 1941) is an Israeli Modern Orthodox and Religious Zionist rabbi.

Biography
Brovender was born in 1941 in Brooklyn, New York. He attended Yeshivah of Flatbush, a coeducational modern Orthodox day school. He later graduated from Yeshiva University, where he earned a BA in mathematics and received rabbinical ordination from Rabbi Joseph B. Soloveitchik.

In 1965 he and his wife made moved to Jerusalem, Israel. Until 1967, he studied in the Kollel of Yeshivas Itri (the Israel Torah Research Institute), under Rabbi Mordechai Elefant. In 1974 Brovender completed a Doctorate in Semitic languages from Hebrew University.

In 1967, on the advice of Rabbi Menachem M. Schneerson, Brovender founded Hartman College, in Romema, Jerusalem (under the aegis of the Israel Torah Research Institute). Its purpose was to serve as a Yeshiva for American students who wanted to study in Israel.

In 1976, Rabbi Brovender founded Yeshivat HaMivtar in French Hill, Jerusalem. That same year, Brovender established Midreshet Lindenbaum, originally named Michlelet Bruria, as the woman's component of Yeshivat Hamivtar. Brovender successfully ran Yeshivat HaMivtar alone until 1985, when he merged it with the network of educational institutions founded by Rabbi Shlomo Riskin called Ohr Torah Stone.

In 2007 Rabbi Brovender launched WebYeshiva.org, the first live and fully interactive online yeshiva.

Rabbi Brovender served as a Rav Tzavai (army rabbi) for more than 20 years.

2000 beating incident
In October 2000, Brovender was beaten by Palestinian police and protesters. At the time, he was the head of the Yeshivat Hamivtar yeshiva in the Israeli settlement of Efrat, and was driving from the yeshiva to his home in Jerusalem when he drove past a Palestinian village to bypass a road closed by recent unrest, and was pulled over by Palestinian police. Palestinian security forces managed to extract him from the scene after about an hour and hand him over to Israeli troops. His vehicle was destroyed by the Palestinian mob.

References

External links
ATID Website
Terror at the Tunnels by Miriam Brovender
Letter from ex-students to Arafat regarding the attack
Official Biography
A Conversation with Rabbi Chaim Brovender
The growing legacy of Rabbi Chaim Brovender

American emigrants to Israel
American Orthodox rabbis
Israeli Orthodox rabbis
Religious Zionist rosh yeshivas
Yeshiva of Flatbush alumni
Yeshiva University alumni
Hebrew University of Jerusalem alumni
Jewish educators
Living people
1941 births